Shulman is an Ashkenazi Jewish surname that literally means "shul-man". A shul is another name for a synagogue, a Jewish house of worship, and the name was usually given to the head of the synagogue or the synagogue's rabbi. It can also appear as a result of double transliteration, to and from the Cyrillic alphabet, of the German surname "Schulmann".

Notable people

Alexandra Shulman, editor of British Vogue
Andrew Shulman, English cellist and conductor
Barry Shulman, American poker player and CEO of the magazine Card Player
Claire Shulman, American politician
Daniel Shulman (disambiguation), several people
David Shulman, American lexicographer
Derek Shulman, Scottish musician
Douglas H. Shulman, Commissioner of the IRS
Eli Baruch Shulman, rosh yeshiva at RIETS
Eliezer Shulman, biblical scholar and historian
Ekaterina Schulmann, Russian political scientist
Eyal Shulman (born 1987), Israeli basketball player
Harry Shulman, dean of Yale Law School, 1954-55
Irving Shulman, American author and screenwriter
Jack Shulman, American communist activist
Jeff Shulman, poker player and editor of Card Player magazine
John Shulman, basketball coach
Julius Shulman, American photographer
Lawrence Shulman, dean of the University at Buffalo
Lee Shulman, American educational psychologist
Mark Shulman (author), American author and publisher
Mark Shulman (rugby league), Australian rugby player
Marshall D. Shulman, American diplomat
Max Shulman, American writer and humorist
Michael Shulman (actor) (born 1981), American actor
Michael Shulman (mathematician) (born 1980), American mathematician
Michael Shulman (writer) (born 1973), American writer
Milton Shulman, Canadian writer and broadcaster
Morton Shulman, Canadian politician
Naphtali Herz Shulman (died ), Russian Hebrew writer
Neville Shulman, English mountaineer and personal consultant to filmmaker Ridley Scott
Nicola Shulman, English biographer
Phil Shulman, Scottish musician
Ray Shulman, English musician
Robert G. Shulman, American biophysicist
Yaniv Shulman, member of Israeli ambient music group Shulman
Yury Shulman, Belarusian chess grandmaster

See also
Schulman

Jewish surnames
Yiddish-language surnames